Bahram in Iran may refer to:
 Bahram Nouraei, Iranian musician
 Bahram, East Azerbaijan
 Bahram, Heris, East Azerbaijan Province
 Bahram, Kurdistan
 Bahram, Lorestan
 Bahram, West Azerbaijan